Matts Evert Kulenius (8 March 1879, Terjärv - 4 February 1958) was a Finnish schoolteacher and politician. He was a member of the Parliament of Finland from 1922 to 1927, representing the Swedish People's Party of Finland (SFP).

References

1879 births
1958 deaths
People from Kronoby
People from Vaasa Province (Grand Duchy of Finland)
Swedish-speaking Finns
Finnish Lutherans
Swedish People's Party of Finland politicians
Members of the Parliament of Finland (1922–24)
Members of the Parliament of Finland (1924–27)
Finnish schoolteachers